Pastoral is a novel by the English author Nevil Shute. It was first published in 1944 by Heinemann. Its theme is that even in the midst of war, and among warriors, everyday life, such as romance, will continue.

Synopsis
Pastoral is a romance set on an English airbase which revolves around the pilot and crew of a Vickers Wellington bomber, their interest in fishing, and the pilot's developing relationship with a young WAAF signals officer.

Reception
After its release the book received reviews from The Washington Post and The New York Times, the latter of which wrote that the book was "an excellent story and its writer grows in sublety and skill with each succeeding novel".

References

External links
 

1944 British novels
Novels by Nevil Shute
British romance novels
Contemporary romance novels
Novels set during World War II
Aviation novels
Heinemann (publisher) books